is a private university in Hachioji, Tokyo, Japan, established in 1978.

External links
  

Educational institutions established in 1978
Private universities and colleges in Japan
Universities and colleges in Tokyo
1978 establishments in Japan